Read Fletcher ( – November 21, 1889) was an American politician, lawyer, co-founder and editor of the Pine Bluff Graphic. Besides service on state court benches, he represented Jefferson County in the Arkansas House of Representatives. He previously served with the Confederate army during the Civil War.

See also
 List of tuberculosis cases
 List of United States attorneys for the Eastern District of Arkansas

Notes

References

External links

 
 Read Fletcher at The Political Graveyard

1829 births
1889 deaths
19th-century American judges
19th-century American lawyers
19th-century American male writers
19th-century American newspaper editors
19th-century American newspaper founders
19th-century American politicians
19th-century deaths from tuberculosis
19th-century Methodists
American lawyers admitted to the practice of law by reading law
Methodists from Arkansas
American slave owners
Arkansas circuit court judges
Arkansas lawyers
Arkansas postmasters
Burials in Arkansas
Confederate States Army officers
Cumberland University alumni
Tuberculosis deaths in Arkansas
Journalists from Arkansas
Democratic Party members of the Arkansas House of Representatives
People from Arkansas County, Arkansas
People from Jefferson County, Arkansas
People from Nashville, Tennessee
People of Arkansas in the American Civil War
People of the Brooks–Baxter War
Pierce administration personnel
Politicians from Pine Bluff, Arkansas
United States Attorneys for the Eastern District of Arkansas